Poetry is an unincorporated community in Chattooga County, in the U.S. state of Georgia.

History
A variant name is "Tulip". A post office called Tulip was established in 1891, and remained in operation until 1948.

The original name "Tulip" was for the tulip trees near the original town site; the present name of "Poetry" was adopted in 1973 since a share of the population of then artist's colony were poets.

References

Unincorporated communities in Georgia (U.S. state)
Unincorporated communities in Chattooga County, Georgia